Larak may refer to the following:
Larak (Sumer), a city in ancient Sumer
Larak, Iran (disambiguation):
Larak, Chaharmahal and Bakhtiari
Larak, Chalus, Mazandaran Province
Larak Island, in Hormozgan Province
Larak Rural District, in Hormozgan Province